Meriel McClatchie is an archaeologist specialising in archaeobotany. She is an associate professor at University College Dublin.

Education 
McClatchie studied Archaeology and History at University College Cork, followed by a Masters degree also at University College Cork. McClatchie completed her PhD  in 2009 at the Institute of Archaeology, University College London.

Research 
McClatchie has worked as a Research Fellow at Queen's University Belfast, University College Dublin and the University College Cork. In 2016 she was appointed an Assistant Professor in Archaeology  at UCD School of Archaeology in 2016, and in 2021 was promoted to an Associate Professor in 2021.

In 2019 she was a Silver Medal winner for a garden at Bloom 2019, on the theme of Irish Diet.

McClatchie has worked variously to promote professional practice. She was a founding member of  the Irish Archaeobotany Discussion Group in 2007 and Environmental Archaeology in Ireland in 2015. From 2009 to 2014 she was a member of the Board of Directors at the Institute of Archaeologists of Ireland. She previously spent a number of years serving on the  Managing Committee of the Association for Environmental Archaeology. Currently, McClatchie is a member of the council of the Society of Medieval Archaeology. In 2016, she was appointed as a Honorary Senior Research Associate of the UCL Institute of Archaeology.

Her research addresses food, landscape and settlement in Europe, from the prehistoric to the post-medieval period. Large-scale data analysis has been used to  investigate Neolithic and early medieval farming in Ireland. Recently, she is a member of the ERC funded FoodCult project.

Selected publications 

 McClatchie, Meriel, et al. 2014. "Neolithic farming in north-western Europe: archaeobotanical evidence from Ireland." Journal of Archaeological Science 51: 206-215.
 McClatchie, Meriel, et al. 2015. "Early medieval farming and food production: A review of the archaeobotanical evidence from archaeological excavations in Ireland." Vegetation History and Archaeobotany 24.1: 179-186.
 McClatchie, M., Bogaard, A., Colledge, S., Whitehouse, N., Schulting, R., Barratt, P., & McLaughlin, T. 2016. Farming and foraging in Neolithic Ireland: An archaeobotanical perspective. Antiquity, 90(350), 302-318. doi:10.15184/aqy.2015.212

References 

Year of birth missing (living people)
Irish archaeologists
Women archaeologists
Archaeobotanists
Alumni of University College Cork
Alumni of the UCL Institute of Archaeology
Academics of University College Dublin
Living people